Glipostenoda imadatei is a species of beetle in the genus Glipostenoda. It was described in 1964.

References

imadatei
Beetles described in 1964